The 2015 World Sprint Speed Skating Championships were held in Astana, Kazakhstan, from 28 February to 1 March 2015.

Schedule
The schedule of events:

All times are local (UTC+6).

Participating nations
59 speed skaters from 16 nations participated. The number of speed skaters per nation that competed is shown in parentheses.

Medal summary

Medal table

Medalists

References

External links
ISU website

 
World Sprint Championships
2015 in Kazakhstani sport
2015 Sprint
World Sprint, 2015
2015 World Sprint Speed Skating Championships